Auvere is a village in Narva-Jõesuu, Ida-Viru County in northeastern Estonia.

See also
Battle of Auvere

References

Villages in Ida-Viru County
Kreis Wierland